Rinnebach may refer to:

Rinnebach (Helme), a river of Thuringia, Germany, tributary of the Helme
Rinnebach (Ohebach), a river of Hesse, Germany, tributary of the Ohebach
Rinnebach (Rur), a river of North Rhine-Westphalia, Germany, tributary of the Rur